Luiz Henrique André Rosa da Silva (born 2 January 2001) is a Brazilian professional footballer who plays as a forward for Real Betis.

Club career

Fluminense
Born in Petrópolis, Rio de Janeiro, Luiz Henrique joined Fluminense's youth setup in 2010, aged 9. He made his first team – and Série A – debut on 12 August 2020, coming on as a second-half substitute for Nenê in a 1–1 home draw against Palmeiras.

On 7 September 2020, Luiz Henrique renewed his contract until September 2025. He scored his first professional goal on 17 October, netting the opener in a 2–2 home draw against Ceará.

Betis
In summer 2022 Luiz Henrique moved to La Liga Real Betis having agreed a contract until 2028.

Career statistics

References

External links
Fluminense FC profile 

2001 births
Living people
People from Petrópolis
Sportspeople from Rio de Janeiro (state)
Brazilian footballers
Association football forwards
Campeonato Brasileiro Série A players
Fluminense FC players
Real Betis players
Brazilian expatriate footballers
Brazilian expatriate sportspeople in Spain
Expatriate footballers in Spain